The 1978 Kansas State Wildcats football team represented Kansas State University in the 1978 NCAA Division I-A football season.  The team's head football coach was Jim Dickey.  1978 was the first year at Kansas State for Dickey.  The Wildcats played their home games in KSU Stadium.

Schedule

References

Kansas State
Kansas State Wildcats football seasons
Kansas State Wildcats football